is a 1974 Japanese action comedy film based on the manga of the same name by Monkey Punch.

It was the first live action film adaptation of the manga, followed by Lupin the 3rd in 2014.

Plot
Arsene Lupin III steal the couple car at the parking lot and drive around Tokyo. He met Fujiko Mine, who was being escorted to prison after being accused of stealing things. So that night, Lupin helped her escape, but Fujiko ditched him and leave him after throwing a card that cuts the branches and landed on his head, knocking him unconscious. Lupin was arrested and interrogated by police inspector Heiji Zenigata VII, but was release latter after no evidence or witness during the jailbreak. Immediately after that, Lupin meets Daisuke Jigen, a professional marksman. Jigen explained the story: Lupin was the grandson of Arsene Lupin, a gentleman thief who was active in France back in the 19th century and formed the Lupin Empire, which bundled criminal organizations around the world.

However, the organization was destroyed by the Maccarone Family, a powerful international crime syndicate led by Big Boss. Lupin's father, Arsene Lupin II and his mother escape Europe by plane and arrived in Japan, where baby Lupin III was put into an orphanage. Inspector Zenigata was told by the Tokyo police Superintendent to be assigned to the Lupin Case with there two detectives Ooka (descendant of Ōoka Tadasuke) & Toyama (descendant of Tōyama Kagemoto). Their mission is to arrested Lupin from causing trouble around the city. Moments later, Zenigata and other officers come faced to face to Lupin at the scrap yard, but Lupin and Jigen escape together, leaving Zenigata completely injured from the chase. The Big Boss, who found out that Lupin is still alive from the massacre, sent killers and assassins to kill him from reviving his family's fortune. Meanwhile, Lupin reunited with Fujiko and decided to steal a jewel with a market value of 5.6 billion yen with 3D. Lupin succeeded in stealing it without difficulty, but after Fujiko's possession of the gemstone, Lupin and the gang are going had to deal with Inspector Zenigata's police units and hitmen of the Maccarone.

Lupin managed to survived four assassination attempts (one hitman at the train yard, two snipers from the place where he slept with a woman and a six female vocal assassins at the bridge called the Dragon Sisters are being sexual harassment from Lupin at the bridge) and was very tired of being followed. So he decided to hand himself over to Zenigata for protection, leaving Jigen and Fujiko do the work all by themselves. Zenigata latter got a call from the chief to delivered the mini-figure clay statue, that wills the alien power, to the research institute as an award for arresting Lupin. Around the same time, the Maccarone Family, who knew Lupin being lock up in jail, they go on with the plan to rob the shading clay figurines, which all the lovers of the world want. Jigen visit to see Lupin as a psychiatrist and tried convincing him to stop fooling around and just inherit his father's fortune. He refused as too much work, but Jigen informs him that Fujiko is on a solo heist to spy on the bosses at the harbor where the yacht was anchored for the meeting.

Feeling bad about his behavior, Lupin gathered all the courage he needs and together the two sets out n the mission to saved the world, including rescue Fujiko. Lupin and Jigen infiltrated the yacht, but only finds Fujiko's throwing card. Meanwhile, Zenigata and his police forces are delivering the stature across the mountain until they are stop by a giant rock. After pushing the rock, they were cornered by Maccarone's goons who ordered them to handed over the cargo, but Jigen managed to grab the statue using a magnet fit it onto a helicopter. As the thugs shoots at him, Zenigata uses his chance by arresting the distracting mafia, but got his feet shot by a German boss with an arm cast for a machine gun. At the mountain hut, Lupin drive his motorcycle and encountered more goons as Fujiko was being held hostage. Suddenly the hut began to collapse, but Jigen safes them in time. Lupin then confessed Fujiko his feelings for her and apologized for being so naughty. Fujiko accept his apology and decided to form a team that will make them a fortune. After delivering the statue the intitude, Zenigata was about to be awarded the Presidential Award for his honorary duty, but the government decided to give the award to Lupin for his action of saving the peace from evil. Being jealous of not getting a prize, the chief gave a thank you letter from the public to Zenigata and orders him to delivered it to Lupin in person.

At the dock, Lupin promised his father that he will take very serious and to put as the new head of the family, with Jigen and Fujiko as partners. Zenigata arrived to tell Lupin about the letter, but they ran off as they think he will catches them. The movie came to an end as a beginning of a running chase between comical thieves and blubbering police inspector.

Cast
 Yūki Meguro as Arsène Lupin III
 Eizo Ezaki as Fujiko Mine
 Kunie Tanaka as Daisuke Jigen
 Shirō Itō as Inspector Heiji Zenigata VII
 Maria Anzai as The Girl at the Wharf
 Kiyoshi Maekawa as Marutakadai
 Hsiao Hui-mei as The Woman in Orange Dress
 "The Poppies" as The Dragon Sisters
 Akira Hitomi as Detective Ōoka
 Takashi Ebata as Detective Toyama
 Rinichi Yamamoto as Genkurobei
 Arihiro Fujimura as The Superintendent of the Metropolitan Police
 E.H. Erick as Sir Mokkinbat
 Hideyo Amamoto as Assassin at Orphanage
 Rena Natsuki as Yamako Asama
 Fujio Tokita as The Vagrant
 Akira Ōizumi as Ichiro Rokunawa, an Assassin
 Sachio Sakai as Security chief
 Toki Shiozawa
 Katsumi Ishiyama
 Jun'ichi Tanaka as Miroku Ōguchi
 Minoru Uezu as Gosaku Inakadori
 Shōzō Fukuyama
 Sanji Kojima
 Katsuo Unno
 Kyūji Aozora as Policeman at the Police Box
 Kōji Aozora as Motorcycle Policeman
 Tōru Ōhira 
 Enver Altenbay as Big Boss (uncredited)

References

External links

1974 films
Films shot in Japan
Lupin the Third films
Live-action films based on manga
1970s heist films
Discotek Media
Japanese heist films